Asilo de la Paz (English: Haven of Peace) is a location on Floreana Island in the Galapagos archipelago. It is the site of Floreana's first human settlement, and is now among the island's most popular tourist attractions. The site has a maximum elevation of 450 meters above sea level.

Wildlife
Asilo de la Paz contains an area of intact Scalesia forest that provides important habitat for multiple species of Darwin's finch, including the critically endangered medium tree finch (Camarhynchus pauper). A warbler finch (Certhidea fusca), previously considered extinct on Floreana, was reportedly heard at Asilo de la Paz in 2008, although this sighting is not universally accepted. Giant tortoises, previously owned as pets by the island's residents, roam a large enclosed area at Asilo de la Paz. These tortoises are a mixture of species from other islands, since Floreana's native tortoise, Chelonoidis elephantopus, has been extinct on the island since shortly after 1835.

See also
 Cerro Pajas

References

Geography of Galápagos Province
Tourist attractions in Galápagos Province